These quarterbacks have started at least one game for the Houston Texans of the National Football League. They are listed in order of the date of each player's first start at quarterback for the Texans.

Regular season

The number of games they started during the season is listed to the right:

Postseason

Due to injuries to both starting quarterback Matt Schaub and backup quarterback Matt Leinart during the 2011 regular season, T. J. Yates became the starter for the rest of the season as well as the playoffs.

Most games as starting quarterback
These quarterbacks have the most starts for the Texans in regular season games.

Team career passing records
(Through the 2022 NFL season)

See also
 Lists of NFL starting quarterbacks

References

Houston Texans
Houston Texans players
quarterbacks